The 2005 Football Conference play-off Final took place on 14 May 2005 and was contested between Stevenage Borough and Carlisle United. It was held at the Britannia Stadium, Stoke and had an attendance of 13,422.

Match

Summary
Carlisle had the first major chance when the ball fell to Derek Holmes and he turned and shot, but Alan Julian in the Stevenage goal saved comfortably. Stevenage's first chance came when they had a corner which they took quickly and Anthony Elding shot just wide from outside the area. The same corner routine had paid off in the semi-final as it had led to Dino Maamria's winning goal against Hereford.

At the other end, Holmes flicked on a long ball for Glenn Murray who controlled the ball on his chest and shot in one movement from 14 yards out, but Julian again saved well. Carlisle then took the lead in the 23rd minute after Tom Cowan's cross was headed into the bottom corner by Peter Murphy. Stevenage pressed forward looking for the equalising goal with Jon Brady finding Darryn Stamp at the back post with a good cross, whose header was deflected over. At the other end, Goodliffe cleared a header off the line to keep Stevenage in the match.

The second half saw Stevenage try everything to get an equaliser. Elding blazed over from just inside the area, George Boyd hit a well worked free kick over the crossbar while Michael Warner had a good run into the area, cutting inside onto his left foot before seeing his goalbound shot saved by the feet of Matt Glennon. In stoppage time there was a late flurry with the ball bouncing around in the Carlisle penalty area with shots raining in from all angles. But Stevenage could not break down Carlisle and it was they who won and gained promotion back to the Football League at first invitation.

Details

References

Play-off Final
Play-off Final 2005
Play-off Final 2005
National League (English football) play-off finals
Conference National Playoff Final 2005
Conference Premier play-off Final